This is a list of universities and other higher education institutions in Polynesia.

Regional
 University of the South Pacific has numerous campuses, as listed below

American Samoa

American Samoa Community College, Mapusaga

Cook Islands

 Takamoa Theological College
 University of the South Pacific - Cook Islands campus

French Polynesia

 Collège La Mennais, Papeete
 University of French Polynesia, Puna'auia

Hawaii, United States

Nauru

University of the South Pacific - Nauru campus

New Caledonia
University of New Caledonia - Noumea

New Zealand

Universities

Wānanga
(with principal campus only)
 Te Wānanga o Aotearoa (TWOA) (Te Awamutu)
 Te Wānanga-o-Raukawa (TWOR) (Ōtaki)
 Te Whare Wānanga o Awanuiārangi (Whakatane)

Institutes of Technology and Polytechnics
(with principal campus only)
 Ara Institute of Canterbury (Christchurch)
 Eastern Institute of Technology (EIT) (Taradale)
 Manukau Institute of Technology (MIT) (South Auckland)
 Nelson Marlborough Institute of Technology (NMIT) (Nelson)
 NorthTec, formerly Northland Polytechnic (Whangarei)
 Otago Polytechnic (Dunedin)
 Southern Institute of Technology (SIT) (Invercargill)
 Tai Poutini Polytechnic (Greymouth)
 The Open Polytechnic of New Zealand (Lower Hutt)
 Toi Ohomai Institute of Technology (Rotorua, Tauranga)
 UCOL (Universal College of Learning) (Palmerston North)
 Unitec Institute of Technology (Auckland)
 Waikato Institute of Technology (Wintec) (Hamilton)
 Wellington Institute of Technology (WelTec) (Petone and Lower Hutt)
 Western Institute of Technology at Taranaki (New Plymouth)
 Whitireia Community Polytechnic (WCP) (Porirua)

Niue

 Lord Liverpool University - Niue campus
 Royal Academy of Fine Arts (Det Jyske Kunstakademi)
 St. Clements University
 University of the South Pacific - Niue campus

Samoa

 National University of Samoa
 Oceania University of Medicine
 Piula Theological College

Tokelau

University of the South Pacific - Tokelau campus

Tonga

 University at 'Atenisi Institute
 Hango Agricultural College
 King's International University
 Tonga Institute of Science and Technology
 Tupou College
 University of the Nations - Tonga campus
 University of the South Pacific - Tonga campus

Tuvalu
 University of the South Pacific - Tuvalu campus

Vanuatu

National University of Vanuatu
 Matevulu College
 Port Vila School of Nursing
 Revans University
 Tagabe Agricultural School
 Talua Ministry Training Centre
 University of the South Pacific - Vanuatu campus
 Vanuatu Agriculture College
 Vanuatu Institute of Teacher Education
 Vanuatu Institute of Technology
 Vanuatu Maritime College

Wallis and Futuna
University de Wallis

References

See also 
 List of colleges and universities
 List of colleges and universities by country

Universities
Polynesia